Miss Earth Venezuela 2009, or Sambil Model 2009, was held on June 12, 2009, in Centro Sambil Margarita, Pampatar, Margarita Island, Venezuela. The winner of the pageant was Jessica Barboza and she represented Venezuela in the Miss Earth 2009 pageant in the Philippines, in October. This was the last edition of Miss Earth Venezuela before the Miss Venezuela Organization took over the franchise.

Results
Sambil Model / Miss Earth Venezuela 2009: Jessica Barboza
Miss Continente Americano Venezuela 2009: Andreína Gomes
1st Runner-up: Nathaly Navas
2nd Runner-up: Yuliana Leal
3rd Runner-up: Sara Angelini

Awards

Miss Internet: Jessica Barboza
Miss Conair: Jessica Barboza
Sambil Model Caracas: Nathaly Navas
Sambil Model Maracaibo: Jessica Barboza
Sambil Model Margarita: Carlisa Maneiro
Sambil Model Valencia: Andreína Gomes
Sambil Model Barquisimeto: Rosángela Schettini
Sambil Model San Cristóbal: Alondra Suárez

Contestants

References

External links
 Miss Earth / Sambil Model Venezuela official web site
 Miss Earth official web site

Miss Earth Venezuela
2009 beauty pageants
2009 in Venezuela